Grevillea excelsior, commonly known as flame grevillea or yellow flame grevillea, is a species of flowering plant in the family Proteaceae and is endemic to the south-west of Western Australia. It is an erect shrub or small tree with usually divided leaves with linear lobes, and clusters of orange flowers.

Description

Taxonomy
Grevillea excelsior was first formally described in 1904 by Ludwig Diels in Ernst Georg Pritzel's Botanische Jahrbücher für Systematik, Pflanzengeschichte und Pflanzengeographie. The specific epithet (excelsior) means "taller".

Distribution and habitat
Flame grevillea grows in mallee heath and is widespread in inland areas of south-western Western Australia between Quairading, Wongan Hills, Coolgardie and the Peak Charles National Park.

Conservation status
Grevillea evanescens is listed as "not threatened" by the Government of Western Australia Department of Biodiversity, Conservation and Attractions.

References

excelsior
Eudicots of Western Australia
Proteales of Australia
Taxa named by Ludwig Diels
Plants described in 1904